Legal Education and the Reproduction of Hierarchy: A Polemic Against the System is an essay by Duncan Kennedy on legal education in the United States of America. The work is a critique of American legal education and argues that legal education reinforces class, race, and gender inequality.

Publication history
The article was first self-published as a pamphlet in 1983. The pamphlet was subsequently reviewed in several major law journals.

See also
Critical legal studies
Philosophy of law

References

External links
Legal Education and the Reproduction of Hierarchy

Philosophy of law
Legal education in the United States
Critical legal studies